Cemal Hünal (born 2 October 1976) is a Turkish actor. 

He studied at Saint Benoit French High School and went on to study theatre and acting at Santa Monica College, UCLA and London Film School.

In late 2010s, he acted in Romantic Comedy, and also in Çağan Irmak's films Ulak and Issız Adam.

On 25 January 2013, 30 Turkish actors, including Cemal Hünal, were taken into custody for a drugs probe by Istanbul's narcotics police.

Filmography

TV series 
 Asi (2007–2009) - Kerim
 Kış Masalı (2009) - Ali Murat
 Adanalı (2010) - Alex
 Seni Bana Yazmışlar (2011) - Yalçın
 Bir Zamanlar Osmanlı: Kıyam (2012) - Murat
 Osmanlı Tokadı (2013) - Moğol
 Tatar Ramazan (2013) - Rüstem Sinan
 Paramparça (2014) - Alper
 Diriliş: Ertuğrul (2017) - Tekfur Ares / Ahmet Alp
 Tozkoparan (2019) - Celal Hoca
 Sadakatsiz (2021) - Sinan
 Bozkır Arslanı Celaleddin (2021)
 Maske Kimsin Sen? (2022)

Film 
 Ulak : Çağan Irmak - (2007) - Ulak İbrahim
 Issız Adam : Çağan Irmak - (2008) - Alper
 Peşpeşe - (2010) - Bora
 Romantik Komedi (2010) - Mert
 Ayaz (2012) - Şahin
 Kaos Örümcek Ağı (2012) - Mansur
 Romantik Komedi 2: Bekarlığa Veda (2013) - Mert
 Günce (2013) - Cengiz
 Kırmızı (2015) - Umut
 Atçalı Kel Mehmet (2017)
 Sinyalciler: Son Akşam Yemeği (2017)
 Kızım Ve Ben (2018) 
 Türkler Geliyor: Adaletin Kılıcı (2020)
 Yanlış Anlama 2 (2022)

References

External links 
 

1976 births
Living people
Turkish male film actors
Turkish male television actors
Male actors from Istanbul